Alexandra Donnelley (born August 13, 1959) is a German-born American actress.

Career 
Donnelley's best-known role is that of Diane Jenkins on the CBS soap opera The Young and the Restless from 1982 to 1984, and again in 1986. Donnelley went on to reprise her role again from October 1996 to February 2001. She also appeared in other television shows and films, such as Cruel Intentions 3.

Personal life 
Donnelley has two daughters from her marriage to musician Robert Lamm.

Filmography

Film

Television

References

External links

Living people
German emigrants to the United States
American television actresses
1959 births
Actors from Frankfurt
21st-century American women